Șerban Iliescu (March 1956 – March 18, 2016) was a Romanian linguist and journalist who worked for the national broadcasting station Radio România Actualități.

Biography 
In 1981, Șerban Iliescu graduated from the Faculty of Foreign Languages and Literatures, English-French department, within the University of Bucharest. Before working in the radio field, he was a French teacher and translator. In 1990, he became one of the first employees of Radio Romania after the 1989 revolution, being first a news presenter and, since 1993, producer of the sections "Radio Guide to Correct Expression" and "The Romanian Language Minute", which were broadcast for twenty-three years on every working day of the week.

In 2003, he was awarded by the National Audiovisual Council.

References

University of Bucharest alumni
Romanian journalists
Linguists from Romania
1956 births
2016 deaths